Polysphaeria is a genus of plants in the family Rubiaceae, and its native range is Madagascar and Tropical Africa. It contains the following 22 species according to Plants of the World Online:
Polysphaeria acuminata Verdc.
Polysphaeria aethiopica Verdc.
Polysphaeria arbuscula K.Schum.
Polysphaeria braunii K.Krause
Polysphaeria capuronii Verdc.
Polysphaeria cleistocalyx Verdc.
Polysphaeria dischistocalyx Brenan
Polysphaeria grandiflora Cavaco
Polysphaeria grandis (Baill.) Cavaco
Polysphaeria hirta Verdc.
Polysphaeria lanceolata Hiern
Polysphaeria lepidocarpa Verdc.
 Polysphaeria macrantha Brenan
Polysphaeria macrophylla K.Schum.
Polysphaeria maxima (Baill.) Cavaco
Polysphaeria multiflora Hiern
Polysphaeria ntemii S.E.Dawson & Gereau
Polysphaeria ovata Cavaco
Polysphaeria parvifolia Hiern
Polysphaeria pedunculata K.Schum. ex De Wild.
Polysphaeria subnudifaux Verdc.
Polysphaeria tubulosa (Baill.) Cavaco

References

External links

 
Rubiaceae genera
Taxonomy articles created by Polbot